Gender roles are culturally influenced stereotypes which create expectations for appropriate behavior for males and females. An understanding of these roles is evident in children as young as age four. Children between 3 to 6 months can form distinctions between male and female faces. By ten months, infants can associate certain objects with females and males, like a hammer with males or scarf with females. Gender roles are influenced by the media, family, environment, and society. In addition to biological maturation, children develop within a set of gender-specific social and behavioral norms embedded in family structure, natural play patterns, close friendships, and the teeming social jungle of school life. The gender roles encountered in childhood play a large part in shaping an individual's self-concept and influence the way an individual forms relationships later on in life.

Parental influences
Parents are the first source of exposure of societal stereotypes that kids receive, starting from color of their room to toys they play with, what to do and what not to do. Expectations for children's future adult lives, like financial success or future care giving, may lead parents to encourage certain behaviors in children. However, most parental behaviors remain uninfluenced by the gender of the child, including speaking to, playing, teaching, and caretaking.

Family dynamics can especially influence gender specialization. Parents of sons are more likely to express conservative gender role views than parents of daughters, with fathers emphasizing the paternal breadwinning role for males. The effects of parental expectations of gender roles can especially be seen in the role children play in household duties. Girls generally do more housework than boys and the type of housework assigned to children largely depends on gender. Thus, household dynamics further advance gender role expectations on children.

Children's toy preferences are significantly related to parental sex-typing, such as girls playing with dolls and boys participating in sports. While both fathers and mothers encourage traditional gender roles in their children, fathers tend to encourage these roles more frequently than mothers. Parents choose activities that they believe their children will enjoy and value. By choosing their children's activities, parents are directly influencing their gender role views and preferences onto their children and shaping expectations.

Hines & Kaufman (1994) examined the toy preferences and behavior in girls with congenital adrenal hyperplasia (CAH), a condition characterized by exposure to high levels of androgens in utero. The results suggested that CAH girls exhibited more masculine-typed behavior observable through toy choice as well as drawings and rough-and-tumble play. While a compelling result, parental expectations, in addition to biology, could play a large role in shaping behavioral outcomes. An early diagnosis might lead parents to expect, and therefore, condone, more masculine-typed behaviors, implicitly socializing the CAH girls to express themselves in certain ways. In normally developing girls, masculine behaviors may be discouraged, and parents may steer their daughters toward more traditionally feminine toys, colors, and preferences. This alternative social explanation complicates the interpretation of neat causality between hormones and behavior.

The way that parents communicate with their children are different based on children's gender. Parents are more willing to express their emotion and use emotional words more frequently toward girls than to boys. Also, when both children have encountered difficulty, girls are encouraged to solve problems based on focusing on internal emotion expression and adjustment while boys are encouraged to deal with external entity problems.

For boys whose father discloses emotions more than the others, boys show a similar level of disclosing emotions with girls, and for the parent who is both emotional expressive, their son will view emotions disclosure as a normal practice rather than attributed it as a female way of acting.

According to attachment theory, the early experience and interaction an infant has with his/her caregiver(s) determined whether the infant is securely attached with the caregiver(s), different attachment styles have different influences on one psychological and interpersonal-relationship development. Searle & Meara 1999 found that among college men, people who are securely attached are less likely to suppress their emotions but feel more comfortable expressing it. Besides secure attachment, three other attachment styles are more likely to value success, power, control, and competition that are considered as traditionally masculine traits, in order to make up the lacking sense of security.

Patterns of play

In early childhood, gender roles become apparent in patterns of play.

Hardy et al. (2009) addresses the differences among preschool boys and girls in their development of fundamental movements. This time period is especially crucial because if a child's fundamental movement skills do not develop properly, then their future development will be drastically impacted. This study took 425 preschool children and asked them to perform specific fundamental movement skills such as locomotor and object control skills. After examining the children performing these movements, the researchers found that female preschoolers are generally better at locomotor movements, while male preschoolers are better at object control. These findings emphasize the need for a superior program in which boys and girls can work together and integrate their skills for a chance at greater development of future skills.

One of the earliest signs of gender differences in play patterns is the appearance of gender-segregated play groups and toy preferences.  Boys tend to be more "rough and tumble" in their play while girls shy away from this aggressive behavior, leading to the formation of separate play groups. In addition, boys tend to gravitate more towards toys such as trucks while girls tend to gravitate towards dolls, but these preferences are not absolutes. A study by Alexander, Wilcox, and Woods showed that female infants showed more visual interest in a doll over a toy truck while male infants showed more visual interest in a toy truck over a doll, but these differences were more pronounced in the females. This study suggests that preferences for feminine or masculine toys precede any sex differences in the perceptual features of such toys, leading to the assumption that gender-based toy preference is innate.

One of the most compelling theories regarding biologically determined gender differences is the idea that male-preference and female-preference for toys are mediated by inequities in visual processing. The central claim is that males and females are preprogrammed to specialize in certain forms of perception: specifically, perception of motion and perception of form and color, respectively. Alexander (2003) makes a particularly strong case. The author suggests that inherent sex differences based on perceptual categories encourage children to seek out playmates of a similar play style, and ultimately predisposes them for later social and gender roles . Human vision operates based on two anatomically grounded systems: the magnocellular pathway (M-cell) and the parvocellular pathway (P-cell). Both pathways are present in males and females, and M-cells are designed to recognize motion, while P-cells specialize in form and color perception. Some research has suggested that sex-linked differences in M-cell versus P-cell dominance could be the underlying factor leading to differential toy preference in children, potentially validating the stereotype that boys prefer toy cars and balls (objects associated with motion) while girls prefer dolls and stuffed animals (objects characterized by distinct facial characteristics, form, and color).

Beyond hormonal explanations, Alexander (2003) also employs an evolutionary biology perspective to link contemporary toy preference to early selective pressures and the development of visual specialization. Specifically, male M-cell pathway dominance is connected back to motion mediated activities like hunting and the throwing of projectiles. Female P-cell dominance is tied to foraging for plants, a task requiring discrimination between colors and memory of form. Color is particularly important in foraging, as discrimination between colors aids in identifying a ripe piece of fruit from the greenery around it. As it were, the "green-red opponent system" is thought to be X-chromosome linked and phylogenetically more recent, in contrast with the more rudimentary "yellow-blue" system present to the same degree in both sexes . According to the theory, this adaptation has persisted throughout human evolution, and may contribute to contemporary sexual-dimorphism in skill and preference. From this position, Alexander (2003) suggests the designation of pink as a girl color and blue as a boy color might not be completely arbitrary after all.

In a separate study by Gredlin and Bjorklund (2005), it was found that there are sex differences in object manipulation.  An experiment was performed by putting a desirable toy in an out-of-reach place but also giving the child 5 different tools he/she could use to help retrieve this object.  The children were put in these conditions and any decision they made was spontaneous and on their own; they were only given a hint after they had failed the task 5 times. The study's results showed that 77% of the boys used one of the tools to reach the toy, while only 31% of the girls used one of the tools. This shows that boys are more likely to participate in object manipulation, and this may be because they spend more time in object-oriented play.  The study also found that girls spend more time in social play.  Evolution may play a role in this phenomenon; the differences in play styles between boys and girls manifest into adult behavior.

Another study by Alexander and Saenz found that two-year-old girls preferred toys that were typically associated with females over those associated with males, but again, two-year-old boys showed only a small preference for masculine toys over feminine toys. These two studies support the notion that toy preferences, while gender-based, are not a perfect indication of gender identity.  Further, a study by Jadva, Hines, and Golombok showed that while male and female infants show more visual attention towards toys specific to their gender, there is no significant sex difference in color or shape preference at a young age, which suggests that, for example, a preference for the color pink in girls stems more from societal norms than from an innate capacity.

Play differences are not concrete, as mentioned, as some play with "other-gendered" toys is quite common. Ruble and Martin showed that there is often cross-gendered play in boys and girls, and this is typical of development. However, it is hypothesized that atypical gendered play patterns, such as a boy who plays almost exclusively with dolls and not typical masculine toys and who prefers to play with girls over boys, are an indication of later homosexuality.

In one study by Eric W. Lindsey and Jacquelyn Mize, context can have a big effect on the types of activities children will partake in. For example, this article outlines that if parents associate certain household tasks with gender unintentionally, the child can get an idea that certain things are "masculine" and "feminine."  This is illustrated in the article by an example of a father doing yardwork with his son instead of interior housework; this inherently gives the son the idea that these tasks are more "manly" and is the man's role to do in the house.  This can effect gender roles in childhood.

Lobel & Menashri (1993) explore how the rigidity of gender schemas guides behavior. The population of interest consisted of preschool children selected from three different preschools in Tel-Aviv, Israel, and the study focused on the relationship between the children's gender-typed toy choice, their frameworks regarding cross-gender behavior, and their concepts of gender constancy. During the procedure, two feminine and two masculine toys were presented to individual children: a visibly new doll, a tattered, old doll, a shiny new truck, and an old, faded truck. Based on a pretest, the dolls and trucks were clearly recognized as feminine and masculine, as well as attractive and unattractive based on their quality. All children preferred the new toy when presented with a pair of singularly gendered toys. Children were first given a toy preference test, then a gender constancy interview, and then a gender-role norms interview. The results indicate that children with a more flexible view on gender-role norms made fewer gender-typed choices than children with rigid norms. Similarly, for children with more flexible gender norms, attractiveness of the toy proved to be more strongly related to preference than the toy's adherence to a traditional gender-role. This result raises the question: from where does this flexibility in gender behavior come? The authors favor the explanation that parental norms play a large role, but insist that further research must be done. Echoing Serbin et al. (2001), they also assert that a certain level of cognitive ability must be reached in order to demonstrate flexibility in gender roles, otherwise conceptions of fundamental gender constancy could become confused with external objects associated with a traditional gender role.

Besides play patterns being an indication of sexual orientation, the presence of homosexual or heterosexual relationships in the family may in turn influence play patterns in children.  It has been suggested that children of same-sex couples are raised differently, resulting in gender roles different from those of heterosexual parents.  This viewpoint is validated in a recent study by Goldberg, Kashy, and Smith, which showed that sons of lesbian mothers were less masculine in the way in which they played than those of gay fathers or heterosexual parents. While this study supports one viewpoint on the effects of same-sex parenting, further research is required to validate the long-term consequences of homosexual parenting.

In a 2015 study, it was found that children over the age of two show a stronger preference for the color of an object, as opposed to what the object was.  The child was more interested in toys that were gender-traditionally colored, regardless if that toy was a toy typical for their gender.  Due to the separation of toys advertised, or colored, for certain genders, it can hinder cognitive and social skills.  Boy oriented toys focus on spatial skills, and girl oriented toys focus on social or verbal skills. In solitary play, both girls and boys are more likely to play with gender typical toys, but as found by Signorella (2012), but in group play, gender neutral activities were more likely.

Friendships

Gender roles can also be seen in friendships and peer interactions at a young age. Studies have found that boys and girls interact with same-sex peers more frequently than with opposite-sex peers. One study found that during early childhood (3- to 5-year-olds), boys affiliate more than girls with a familiar same-sex peer and that boys visited the peer more often than girls did and more boys than girls spent a significant amount of time with the peer. A different study found boys and girls were found to engage in highly similar frequencies of dyadic interaction. However, girls engaged in more extended dyadic interaction and boys in greater number of episodes. This study found this to be true at both 4 and 6 years, indicating that sex differences in patterns of dyadic interaction emerge before 5 years. In terms of group activity, boys were found to engage in more coordinated group activity after 5 years of age than before. 

Studies with preschool children yield large effects indicating that boys have more integrated social networks than girls in that their friends or playmates are more likely to be friends or playmates with one another. Likewise, a particular study looking at friendship patterns of youth in middle childhood and early adolescence at summer camp found a large effect for social network density favoring boys toward the end of summer camp, suggesting that over time, friends of boys but not girls are increasingly likely to become friends with one another.

In terms of behavioural patterns seen in friendships, no differences have been found in helping behavior in youngest middle childhood youth. Looking at the content of peer interaction, middle childhood youth girls have been found to spend more time in social conversation and self-disclosure than boys. Girls have also been found to respond in a more prosocial manner to hypothetical conflict situations in middle childhood and early adolescence. Studies of middle childhood typically reveal significant effects indicating that girls are more likely than boys to receive several types of provisions in their friendships, including higher levels of closeness, affection, nurturance, trust, validation, and acceptance. However, no differences have been found for friendship satisfaction.

A study looked at dyadic friendships, which is believed to be the preferred form of relationship for girls, and found that bonds between males are more durable than those between females. This study reports that beginning as early as 6 years old, external observers report fewer males' than females' same-sex friendships had ended.

School

As children grow and develop over the years, their gender identity and development can be influenced by gender bias in books. Such biases and stereotypes limit the development of a child. Positive behavior, gender roles, and better self-concept, in children, are influenced by books that are not gender-biased. By the time children are entering preschool or kindergarten, they have a general understanding of male and female gender and have internalized some basic schemas regarding the roles and appearances of each. These schemas have been mostly furnished by parental interaction, media exposure, and underlying biological factors (e.g. inherent aggressiveness, sexual orientation), though some children may also learn from limited social interaction with individuals outside the family. However, these early conceptions of gender roles undergo radical change when the child enters school. Here, the child will encounter a wide variety of approaches to gender, assimilating new information into their existing structures and accommodating their own outlook to fit new individuals, institutional demands, and novel social situations. This process of socialization is differentiated between gender, and general trends in the social constructs of elementary age children reflect the organization of gender within the family and society at large.

One way of evaluating gender roles in school children is to dissect the popularity hierarchies that they construct and inhabit. Many studies have done just this, and significant differences are evident between genders. Athletic prowess is by far the most significant factor in popularity among boys, and one study even reported that the most popular male at each school they observed was the best athlete. Those who are not athletically inclined can still attain moderate levels of popularity by merely adopting an interest in sports, while boys who are neither athletically inclined nor interested in sports are commonly harassed and victimized by their more popular peers. For example, Kostas 2021 has argued that boys who are not interested in football or other masculine sports and do not embody certain characteristics around which masculinity is constructed (e.g. sporting prowess, speed, emotional and physical strength)are seen as effeminate by their classmates and subjected to exclusionary practices such as name calling (e.g. ‘poofs’, ‘sissies’, and ‘gays’). This might be seen as an extension of the rough and aggressive play that boys seek at a young age. Boys can also become popular by wearing "cool" clothes and possessing trendy gadgets, although this is a much more important factor among girls. Socioeconomic status, which contributes greatly to a child's ability to obtain cool products, is considered one of the most important factors in a girl's popularity at school. Daughters of affluent parents are able to afford the expensive makeup and accessories that allow them to mimic societal standards of superficial beauty, making them more attractive to boys and more popular.

The role of academic achievement in determining popularity also differs considerably between gender; in the first few years of school, scholastic success correlates positively with the popularity of boys. However, as boys near adolescence, doing well in school is often viewed as a source of shame and an indication of femininity. Additionally, disregard for authority and an attitude of disobedience is common among popular boys. Among girls, academic achievement has little correlation with popularity at all. Girls are more likely to value effort over inherent ability, while the opposite is true for boys. Both genders place a value on social intelligence, with children more skilled at mature interaction with peers and adults generally being more popular.

The independent hierarchical popularity structures for boys and girls act as mechanisms that mediate the interaction of the two genders. At first, cross-gender interaction is discouraged as the boys and girls divide themselves and create mostly separate social spheres. Especially among boys, behavior and habits associated with the opposite gender are deemed undesirable and punishable traits. Although most young boys exhibit curiosity regarding the opposite sex while in a private setting, such curiosity displayed in public is socially unacceptable. Members of each gender strive to attain their actively constructed, somewhat shared, ideal of masculinity or femininity, at the same time harboring a secret interest in the mysteries of the opposite gender.  As children mature and refine their ideas about what it means to be a man or a woman, it gradually becomes acceptable to approach individuals of the other sex. Cross gender relationships generally improve social status only to the extent that they are romantically oriented, as mere friendships that do not involve kissing or dating are often viewed with suspicion. Early on, interaction with the opposite gender is reserved for only the most popular boys and girls, and couples tend to match themselves roughly according to popularity through junior high and beyond.

Stereotypes in the media 

Young children aged four to five years old have been shown to possess very strong gender stereotypes. In addition to parents' and teachers' intentional efforts to shape gender roles, children also learn through mass media (television, books, radio, magazines, and newspaper), to which children are exposed to every day.  For preschool-aged children, an important source of such information is the picture books written specifically for their age group, which are often read and reread to them in their impressionable years. In a study done by Oskamp, Kaufman, and Wolterbeek, it was found that in picture books for the preschool audience, the male characters played the more active and explorative role and the female characters played the more passive and social role. Of course, these studies completely neglect the profound effects of genetics on imposing gender-specific behavior.

From birth, children are able to quickly learn that a great deal of their lives have to deal with masculinity and femininity. Even though many environmental factors influence construction of gender, nothing in biology labels behaviors as right or wrong, normal or abnormal. Though parents and teachers teach these lessons intentionally as well as unintentionally, young children also learn through television. As has been proven, a significant source of cultural gendered messages is television, perhaps most powerful for children who watch up to an average of four hours daily. With impressionable young minds, a wide variety of information can help shape these children's views on male and female roles in society.

Children are exposed to Disney media through both film and retail products. In 2015, Disney made $2.64 billion in global retail sales. Through these films and products, Disney portrays distinct gender roles. Parents tend to view Disney Princess media as a safe choice for their children compared to more sexualized media characters and programs. Some parents proceed with caution when it comes to Disney media as Disney has fostered criticism for glamorizing its characters, creating female protagonists who need to be saved by men, and adding sexual subliminal messaging.

In 19 Disney movies (The Lion King, Snow White and the Seven Dwarfs, Aladdin, Cinderella, Toy Story, Beauty and the Beast, The Little Mermaid, Bambi, Pocahontas, The Jungle Book, Peter Pan, 101 Dalmatians, The Fox and the Hound, Pinocchio, Lady and the Tramp, Hunchback of Notre Dame (1996), Hercules (1997), Mulan (1998), and Tarzan (1999)), it was found that males made up 63% of Disney characters while females made up 28%. The other 9% were characters whose gender could not be determined. Disney female characters were six times more likely to partake in housework than their male counterparts. Also, the average princess is young and beautiful with large eyes, a small nose and chin, bigger breasts, a thin body type, and good skin. In research done on the effects of Disney characters, results have shown that as early as preschool, children begin to demonstrate a preference for thin body figures. Girls around 5 and older display worries about getting fat and begin to experience issues with body esteem.

Educational researchers studied children in kindergarten to see how Disney media affected children's play time. Disney media toys encourage children to role play through repeating familiar scripts and characters that they have seen in Disney programs. This sets literary limits and social boundaries for the children as they repeat similar dialogue, plot points, and character roles. This also means that Disney Princess toys influence children's behavior by conveying subtle narratives about both identity and status as they often reflect societal beliefs about both gender and childhood.

Disney has three distinct eras of princesses—classical, renaissance, and revival. Each of these eras portray distinct stereotypes. The Classical Princesses include Snow White, Cinderella, and Aurora. These films were created during a time where family values and the idea of a housewife was present in American society. These characters have domestic lifestyles and are described as innocent and pure, often being associated with flowers (roses). The Renaissance Princesses include Ariel, Belle, and Mulan. This era coincided with third-wave feminism. The princesses are seen fighting their patriarchal systems and tend to be less passive, but they still reinforce many of the same values. They are highly praised for their beauty, and a large emphasis remains on finding true love. The Revival Princesses are Tiana, Mérida, and Rapunzel. These protagonists are more independent and intelligent, but they are often viewed as odd or crazy, such as Tiana, for having a dream and vision for their lives. These characters are modern, hardworking, and independent.

A study done by Powel and Abel analyzed how sex-role stereotypes in television programs such as Teletubbies and Barney are aimed at the preschool audience. In their analysis, Powel and Abel found that gendered messages and behavior is present in preschool television programming and this was found through eight different themes and out of the eight themes five of them, leadership, appearance, gendered roles, occupations, and play roles, were significantly gendered. In both Barney and Teletubbies, males served as the leaders and the director of action. The three youngest Teletubbies automatically followed the oldest who happens to be masculine. The pattern being set is that males lead and females follow. On the other hand, Barney is also the male leader but he leads the children as a caring, social values, "feminized" male teacher. The reconfiguring of leadership as social and friendly leadership can be seen an alteration of a typical male teacher but the sex-stereotype of male being leaders is reinforced for the preschool aged children. Reconfiguring of the male characters was also prevalent for the four remaining themes that were gendered. The males in these shows were taller in stature, wore darker colored clothing but sometimes wore shorts and skirts. As for gendered roles, the males were generally more active while the females were more social and passive. Neither program showed men and women in non-stereotypical occupational roles, indicating that at an early age, children are exposed to gender -specific occupational expectations. In play roles when it was either time for story time or play time the females played the more passive roles such as setting up a picnic, while the males played the more active roles such as fox chasing. These findings help shed light on to the findings from a study carried out by Durkin and Nugent.

Durkin and Nugent examined four- and five-year-old children's predictions concerning the sex of the persons carrying out a variety of common activities and occupations on television. The children's responses revealed strong gender stereotyped expectations, and these were strongest in the case of masculine stereotyped activities. Also, they found that children's estimates of their own future competence also indicated stereotypical beliefs, with the females more likely to reject masculine activities . Young children will indeed see stereotypical sex-role models of the feminine and masculine in the media that is geared towards them, but they will also see social skills being affirmed for both sexes.

Environmental factors and parental influences 
The first major exposure to gender roles typically comes from a child's parents. Children are often dressed in gender specific clothing and given gender specific toys from birth. Parents may encourage children to participate in gender stereotypical play, such as girls playing with dolls and boys playing with trucks. Parents may also model gender normative behavior, both unintentionally and intentionally. Parental disapproval for failing to comply with gender norms and parental approval for successful compliance with these norms can serve to solidify children's understanding of gender roles.

The parental affect and level of disciple children receive may be related to their gender. In 2001, Claire Hughes found parents of young girls were more likely to have more positive overall affect and stronger discipline. Hughes also found parental warmth to be associated with the development of theory of mind for girls, but not for boys. Hughes suggested this may have to do with a greater tendency for girls to use understanding of mind to seek emotional support, empathize, and cooperate. Children can learn about emotions in a few different ways, by witnessing others’ feelings and emotions, having their emotional displays responded to, and lastly through being taught about their feelings and emotions.  Parents have been found to talk about emotions differently to their sons and daughters. Both mothers and fathers use more emotion words and make more references to sadness and disliking of events, with their daughters than their sons. As a result of this, girls use more emotion words than boys do. Girls’ emotional socialization has in a way been more developed because of this. Not only do girls understand emotions better but, they are also better than boys at applying cultural standards of emotion expression in everyday life.  Girls and boys may also differ in the ways they apply their awareness of mind to their relationships with others. One example of this is, girls may show a greater tendency than boys to use their increasing understanding of mind to elicit emotional support, or to develop their skills of empathy and cooperation.

Children between the ages of 3 to 6 may have difference in their levels of interest in infants and practicing nurturance behaviors. Judith Blakemore found that when children were given opportunities to interact with infants, boys were less likely to show interest in the younger child. In general, children without younger siblings were more likely to show interest, which may be related to the novelty of an infant. Of children with younger siblings, the gender difference was strong, and may be related to the child having learned gender roles by viewing the upbringing of their siblings. No group showed less interest in the infants than the male children with siblings. Children with egalitarian parents tended to show the least gender differences in interest in the infants.

Gender identity 
Testing infants is complex and challenging and determining the right age that a child develops their sense of sex or other’s sex. Girls begin gender labeling earlier than boys. Sex differences as children play start at 17 months. Children start understanding gender differences at that age influences gender stereotypes in play, where boys play with certain toys and girls with others.

Children between 3 to 6 months can form distinctions between males and female faces. By ten months, infants can associate certain things with females and males, like a hammer with a man or scarf with a woman.

Gender identity typically develops in stages:

 Around age two: Children become conscious of the physical differences between boys and girls.
 Before their third birthday: Most children can easily label themselves as either a boy or a girl.
 By age four: Most children have a stable sense of their gender identity

During this same time of life, children learn gender role behavior—that is, doing "things that boys do" or "things that girls do." However, cross-gender preferences and play are a normal part of gender development and exploration regardless of their future gender identity. The point is that all children tend to develop a clearer view of themselves and their gender over time. At any point, research suggests that children who assert a gender-diverse identity know their gender as clearly and consistently as their developmentally matched peers and benefit from the same level of support, love, and social acceptance.

How children typically express their gender identity 
In addition to their choices of toys, games, and sports, children typically express their gender identity in the following ways:

 Clothing or hairstyle
 Preferred name or nickname
 Social behavior that reflects varying degrees of aggression, dominance, dependency, and gentleness.
 Manner and style of behavior and physical gestures and other nonverbal actions identified as masculine or feminine.
 Social relationships, including the gender of friends, and the people he or she decides to imitate.

Gender development is a normal process for all children. Some children will exhibit variations―similar to all areas of human health and behavior. However, all children need support, love, and care from family, school, and society, which fosters growth into happy and healthy adults.

Children associate particular possession for males or females like shirt and dress at first stages, and at further stages associate characteristics like hardness and roughness with boys and caring and softness with girls (Quinn et Stereotypes are found to be rigid at 5-6years and become flexible by 8–10 years. Older children can differentiate that a girl can love playing with trucks and airplanes.

Social impacts 
The social impacts of imposing gender roles on children become evident very early in life and usually follow the child as they continue their development. It is most observable when they interact with other members of their age group. A child's peers serve as both an archetype and a sounding board for the proper way to express themselves. Alice Eagly affirms the idea that gender roles are a direct result of one's social interactions. She calls social behavior "gender-stereotypic" and says that most of the expectations of gender roles come from the stereotypes associated with them, such as a woman to be kind and compassionate and a man to be in control and independent. "This theory implicates conformity to gender-role expectations as a major source of the sexes' differing behavior." As a child explores those things in life that they may enjoy, the acceptance or criticism or their peers is crucial in whether or not they will continue to perform an activity.

Children are especially apt at noticing when one of their peers violates their established gender role. As Fagot (1990) found, children had a pronounced response when one of their peers violated their established gender role. Same-sex peers acted as the distributors of both rewards for proper gender role behavior and punishments for improper gender role behavior. Boys who preferred to play with dolls rather than trucks were five to six times more likely to be harassed by their peers than those who conformed to the norm. Girls who preferred to play firefighter rather than nurse were ignored rather than criticized. Most importantly, Fagot's study shows the effect of gender segregation on children; boys tended to respond more readily to feedback from other boys while girls likewise responded to feedback from other girls. By surrounding themselves with members of the same sex, children are placing themselves in a situation where they more readily accept and conform to accepted gender roles.

In-group and out-group hostility at a young age is associated with a child liking their sex identity and seeking to maintain stereotype characters rather than hostility towards the out-group. Pre-schoolers and children aged 3–5 show a negative reaction and punishment like ridicule when someone from their in-groups, either boys or girls, play with a toy associated with the out-group. Less masculine boys are laughed at and often shunned in school and rejected by their peers. Gender prejudice begins as early as pre-school. Gender typing is extreme in young children where girls may refuse to wear anything but dresses and boys will not play with anything associated with a girl. However, the rigidity ends, and individual differences occur over 10–12 years.

A study by Carol Martin (1990) shows that cross-sex behavior is generally discouraged in both sexes, though more so in males. Those that do exhibit cross-sex behavior are branded as either a sissy (a rather derogatory term used for boys exhibiting feminine characteristics) or a tomboy (a term for girls exhibiting male characteristics, though not as stigmatized as sissy). Gender roles place constraints upon what a child is allowed to do, based upon what their peers deem is acceptable.

As children grow older and are more able to grasp the concept of gender and gender roles, they begin to spend more time with children of the same sex, further exacerbating the proliferation of gender roles. Martin and Fabes observed that by the age of two, children were already beginning to show a preference for interacting with children of the same sex. By the time a child is three or four, the vast majority of their peer interactions are with members of the same sex. As Maccoby observed, by the age of four and a half, children spend three times as much time with same-sex play partners; by six and a half, that amount increases to eleven times. Martin and Fabes observed that as the children began to segregate themselves by gender, the activities they performed also aligned with their chosen play partners; boys tended to choose playmates who were more active and rowdy while girls chose playmates that were more calm and cooperative.

Children generally fall into these patterns with little guidance from either parents or teachers; they are encouraged to interact with members of the same sex and begin to adopt behavior that is considered gender appropriate. This phenomenon is known as self-socialization and drives the interaction between children throughout their young lives. This instinctive segregation encourages the gap between males and females and helps to reinforce gender roles as the child continues to grow.

Sex stereotypes limit both women and men when it comes to choices. Men tend not to vote for women as presidents, a form of how in-group stereotypes at young age shapes behavior.

Social Cognitive Theory and it's Impact on Gender Role Development 

Within social cognitive theory, also known as social learning theory, behaviors are learned through observation, modeling, and positive/negative reinforcement. Although there are many theories surrounding gender development (biological, social, and cognitive), however the main focus of this article will pertain to social cognitive theory, developed by Albert Bandura. Social approaches to gender development consider how males and females adopt different gender norms and stereotypes throughout their childhoods when exposed to them in their environment, whether that be at home, in school, or with their peers.

Prior to the name "Social Cognitive Theory," gender development was originally viewed through a traditional learning standpoint, which stemmed from behaviorism. This was developed through the premise that children develop gender-based behaviors and stereotypes through positive and negative reinforcement. For example, positive reinforcement is used when a child plays with a toy consistent with their gender and negative reinforcement is used when a child plays with a toy that is not consistent with their gender, therefore, "the behavior that is rewarded increases and the behavior that is punished decreases." In the early 1960s, traditional learning theory was changed to social learning theory by psychologists like Albert Bandura due to the acknowledgement of the significance of modeling and imitation in social development. In 1966, Walter Michel was the first to apply social learning theory to gender development in his book "The Development of Sex Differences." Learning through observation, also known as modeling, "refers to a person's tendency to learn vicariously by observing other people engage in gender-typed behaviors and witnessing the responses that these people receive from others." Albert Bandura then revised social learning theory again in the 1980s into social cognitive theory. First introduced to gender development in 1999, his idea was to improve upon social learning theory by adding the importance of cognitive influences on learning and a stronger emphasis on social and environmental influences.

Gender has a great influence on an individual's personality, social life, and decisions. Western societies are structured by the two-sex model which "refers to our understanding of people existing as two biologically dichotomous sexes." This model also explains what it means to be masculine vs. feminine in this culture. Gender is different from sex, however, as sex is biological while gender is "socially and psychologically constructed, referring to the given roles, behaviors, and characteristics deemed appropriate for either a man or a woman, as determined by social norms."

Social cognitive theorists argue that gender development occurs due to three factors: personal, behavioral, and environmental. Personal factors are an individual's own thoughts, observations and decisions; behavioral factors are actual actions taken out; environmental factors are any social influences faced by an individual. Although many environments can and have been used to conduct research on child gender development, the family is one of the greatest influences because it provides the child's first experience with gender-related ideals. According to Martin and Ruble, "Parental expectations about what it means to have a child who is either a boy or girl become displayed as actions with the child, and these embodied expectations interact with the child's phenotypic and early behavioral factors." From the beginning, children look at their mothers and fathers as role models. Parents share, portray, and model behaviors that children soon associate as what men and women should and should not do. Not only are gender norms and stereotypes formed at this time in an adolescents life, but also emotions. Girls are taught how to handle and display their emotions differently than boys. A girl crying is more accepted in Western societies than a boy crying. Girls are expected to be more feminine, emotional and welcoming (internalizing emotions) while boys are expected to hold back emotions and display masculinity (externalizing emotions). This can be portrayed simply through how a parent speaks about and reacts to a child's behaviors and emotions. It was found through research that mothers who held strong gender stereotypes to their daughters resulted in the same stereotypes being presented in their daughters. Along with parental influence on gender norms and stereotypes, there is also an influence from siblings. Research has proven that young children who have same-sex siblings of older age were more likely to adopt their sibling's gender related norms and stereotypes than those children with opposite-sex siblings. There is an essential hypothesis in social learning theory in which gender development in children is partially influenced more by same-sex model figures than by opposite-sex model figures. As previously mentioned, this is a possibility and research has proven that, however, further evidence states "children discern what behaviors are appropriate for each sex by watching the behavior of many male and female models and by noticing the differences between the sexes in the frequency with which certain behaviors are performed in certain situations."

Not only does social cognitive theory prove that modeling parents, siblings, and peers influence adolescent gender norms, but it also proves that children model behaviors and ideas seen on television and other forms of media. A study was conducted in which researchers had young boys and girls watch superhero media. The research found that the younger boys modeled the superhero behavior seen on television, while the girls did not. This proves that the observation of television role-models and other media have great influence on children, especially when the media portrays gender norms specific to one gender (ex: superheroes appeal more to boys than girls, whereas princesses appeal more to girls.) Overall, social cognitive theory, also known as social learning theory, has proven that young boys and girls learn through modeling, positive and negative reinforcement in reaction to gender-typed behavior, and thus form their own expectancies, thoughts, and norms regarding gender.

References

Further reading

Gender roles
Child development